The O'odham peoples, including the Tohono O'odham, the Pima or Akimel O'odham, and the Hia C-ed O'odham, are indigenous Uto-Aztecan peoples of the Sonoran desert in southern and central Arizona and northern Sonora, united by a common heritage language, the O'odham language. Today, many O'odham live in the Tohono O'odham Nation, the San Xavier Indian Reservation, the Gila River Indian Community, the Salt River Pima-Maricopa Indian Community, the Ak-Chin Indian Community or off-reservation in one of the cities or towns of Arizona.

Oʼodham sub-groups

References

Native American tribes in Arizona
Southwest tribes
Indigenous peoples in Mexico
Oasisamerica cultures